Md. Ziaur Rahman (born 7 December 1952) is a Bangladesh Awami League politician and the incumbent Jatiya Sangsad member representing the Chapai Nawabganj-2 constituency.

Career
Rahman was elected to parliament from Chapai Nawabganj-2 as a Bangladesh Awami League candidate in 2008. Rahman has won the by-elections to Chapainawabganj-2 constituency with 94,928 votes in 2023.

References

1952 births
Living people
People from Chapai Nawabganj district
Awami League politicians
9th Jatiya Sangsad members
11th Jatiya Sangsad members
Place of birth missing (living people)